Canton of Dijon may refer to:

 Canton of Dijon-1, Arrondissement of Dijon, Côte-d'Or, France
 Canton of Dijon-2, Arrondissement of Dijon, Côte-d'Or, France
 Canton of Dijon-3, Arrondissement of Dijon, Côte-d'Or, France
 Canton of Dijon-4, Arrondissement of Dijon, Côte-d'Or, France
 Canton of Dijon-5, Arrondissement of Dijon, Côte-d'Or, France
 Canton of Dijon-6, Arrondissement of Dijon, Côte-d'Or, France
 Canton of Dijon-7, Arrondissement of Dijon, Côte-d'Or, France
 Canton of Dijon-8, Arrondissement of Dijon, Côte-d'Or, France

See also
 Dijon (disambiguation)